The USS Banner (AKL-25, then AGER-1) was originally U.S. Army FS-345 serving in the Southwest Pacific during the closing days of World War II as one of the Army's United States Coast Guard crewed ships. In 1950 the ship was acquired by the Navy and converted into a light auxiliary cargo (AKL). In 1967 the ship was converted for electronic intelligence and reclassified as Auxiliary General Environmental Research (AGER).

Construction
Banner was built as a Design 381 coastal freighter for the United States Army as U.S. Army FS-345 at Kewaunee Shipbuilding and Engineering Corporation, Kewaunee, Wisconsin, United States.

History
U.S. Army FS-345 was Coast Guard manned during World War II, commissioning at Kewaunee 26 July 1944. The vessel was assigned to the Southwest Pacific Area operating there and moving north with Allied advances to Guam and finally Manila, being anchored there 1 July 1945 – 31 August 1945.

The ship was acquired by the Navy on 1 July 1950 and placed in service by the Military Sea Transportation Service and sometime before 20 August 1952 designated as T-AKL-25. On 5 September 1952 T-AKL-25 was renamed Banner and then, on 24 November 1952, at Pearl Harbor, T.H. commissioned as USS Banner (AKL-25). The ship was assigned to Service Division (ServDiv) 51, Service Force, Pacific Fleet, supplying advanced Pacific bases until assigned regular duty in the Mariana Islands supplying bases in those islands as well as at Chichijima and Hahajima from Guam with occasional trips to Japan or Hong Kong.

On 25 July 1965 Banner departed Guam for the Puget Sound Naval Shipyard where from August to October 1965 she was converted to an "environmental research ship." In reality, the ship was converted to a SIGINT platform. Banner returned to Japan in 1966 operating out of Yokosuka where she was redesignated AGER-1 on 1 June 1967.

Banner operated with USS Pueblo (AGER-2) and USS Palm Beach (AGER-3) gathering signals intelligence for the remainder of her career. In mid-1969 Banner was found unfit for further service and decommissioned at Yokosuka, Japan, on 14 November 1969 and struck from the Naval Vessel Register on the same day. The ship was sold for scrapping on 5 June 1970 to Mitsui & Co., Tadotsu, Japan.

Former seamen
 Nathaniel M. Gorton, federal judge

Footnotes

References

Bibliography

1944 ships
Cold War auxiliary ships of the United States
Ships of the United States Army
Design 381 coastal freighters
United States Navy in the 20th century
Banner-class environmental research ships
Ships built in Kewaunee, Wisconsin